George Morrison Williamson (May 9, 1892 – May 19, 1979) was an American architect.

Williamson was born May 9, 1892, in Port Jefferson, New York. He studied at Cornell University with a degree in Mechanical and Electrical Engineering and worked as the Albuquerque representative for the Texas-based architectural firm Trost & Trost before starting his own firm in 1925. He died in 1979 and is interred at Arlington National Cemetery. Physicist Stirling Colgate was his son in law.

A number of his works are listed on the National Register of Historic Places.

Works include (with variations in attribution):
Brown Hall, New Mexico Institute of Mining and Technology, Socorro, New Mexico (Williamson, George), NRHP-listed
Connor Hall, 1060 Cerrillos Rd., NMSD, Santa Fe, New Mexico (Williamson, George), NRHP-listed
El Raton Theater, 115 N. Second St., Raton, New Mexico (Williamson, George M.), NRHP-listed
Grant County Courthouse, 201 N. Cooper St., Silver City, New Mexico (with W. Miles Brittelle), contributing property to NRHP's Silver City Historic District
Kimo Theater, 423 Central Ave. NW, Albuquerque, New Mexico (with Carl Boller)
Manual Arts Building, Albuquerque High School, Albuquerque, New Mexico
Saint Joseph 1930 Hospital, 715 Grand, NE, Albuquerque, New Mexico (Williamson, George M.), NRHP-listed
Springer Building, 121 Tijeras Ave., NE, Albuquerque, New Mexico (Williamson, G.M.), NRHP-listed
Sunshine Building, 120 Central Ave SW, Albuquerque, New Mexico (Trost & Trost)

See also
George H. Williamson, also an architect, similar name
George Williams (Idaho architect), similar name

References

Architects from New Mexico
20th-century American architects
Cornell University College of Engineering alumni
Burials at Arlington National Cemetery
People from Port Jefferson, New York
1892 births
1979 deaths